Haworthia floribunda is a species of succulent plant in the genus Haworthia native to the Cape Province of South Africa. It grows in rosettes with dark green, lanceolate leaves that curve or twist outward. The leaves may be smooth or, in H. floribunda var dentata, have small teeth.

References 

floribunda
Flora of South Africa